The New York School for the Deaf is a private school for the deaf in Greenburgh, New York, in Westchester County just north of New York City, United States.

History

The New York School for the Deaf was chartered in 1817 as the New York Institution for the Instruction of the Deaf and Dumb, and opened its first classes in New York City in 1818 just after the American School for the Deaf, and thus is recognized as the second oldest deaf school in the United States.  It moved twice in the 19th century to other Manhattan locations, and finally to Greenburgh, New York in 1938, where it remains.

The school had its origins in 1808, when the Rev. John Stanford gathered a small group of deaf children to teach them the alphabet and basic language skills in New York City.  In 1892 the school was the first U.S. school of any kind to introduce a military curriculum.  For half a century, tight formation drill was an everyday occurrence on the parade grounds.

In 1952, the school dropped the military curriculum and welcomed girls again, and since then has expanded its programs to benefit both deaf and hard-of-hearing school children, and more recently, pre-school classes as well.

Education 

Since 1977, Fanwood uses the total communication method of deaf education, which employs multiple means of communication including sign language and other modes, as necessary for each child.

Technology 

TTY phones and closed caption TVs were used in the 1970s. More recently the school has introduced video phones, interactive whiteboards and computer assisted learning.

Organization 

NYSD is a private, tax-exempt non-profit organization under article 501(c)(3) of U.S. law.

Distinguished alumni, faculty, and visitors 
 Bernard Bragg - deaf performer, writer, director, poet, and artist
 De Witt Clinton - first President of the Board of Trustees
 Helen Keller - visited the school as a teenager in 1893, chaperoned by her friend Alexander Graham Bell 
 Samuel Morse - trustee, 1861-1863
 James M. Nack - deaf poet
 Frederick Augustus Porter Barnard - deaf American scientist and educator
 Andrew Leete Stone - professor, Civil War chaplain, writer, pastor

References

External links 

Special education in the United States
Schools for the deaf in the United States
Educational institutions established in 1817
Private K-12 schools in Westchester County, New York
Deaf studies
Deaf culture in the United States